is a private vocational school in Minato, Tokyo, Japan.

History 
The origin of the school was founded in 1908. It was chartered as a vocational school in 1976.

Courses
 English
 Early childhood education

Notable former students
 Akie Abe, wife of Shinzō Abe, the Prime Minister of Japan

See also 
 University of the Sacred Heart (Japan)

References

External links 
  

Christianity in Tokyo
Catholic schools in Japan
Education in Tokyo